Sratsimir Hill (‘Halm Sratsimir’ \'h&lm sra-tsi-'mir\) is the hill rising to 720 m at the north extremity of Korten Ridge on Davis Coast in Graham Land, Antarctica. It is situated on Svilengrad Peninsula and surmounts Lanchester Bay to the west and Jordanoff Bay to the northeast.

The hill is named after the settlement of Sratsimir in Northeastern Bulgaria, in association with the Bulgarian ruler Tsar Ivan Sratsimir, 1356–1396.

Location
German-British mapping in 1996.

Map
 Trinity Peninsula. Scale 1:250000 topographic map No. 5697. Institut für Angewandte Geodäsie and British Antarctic Survey, 1996.

Notes

References
 Sratsimir Hill. SCAR Composite Antarctic Gazetteer
 Bulgarian Antarctic Gazetteer. Antarctic Place-names Commission. (details in Bulgarian, basic data in English)

External links
 Sratsimir Hill. Copernix satellite image

Hills of Graham Land
Bulgaria and the Antarctic
Davis Coast